Amblyodipsas ventrimaculata, or the Kalahari purple-glossed snake, is a species of venomous rear-fanged snake in the Atractaspididae family. It is endemic to Namibia, Botswana, northern Zimbabwe, and western Zambia.

References

Roux, Jean. 1907. Sur quelques Reptiles sud-africains. Rev. suisse Zool. 15:75-86. (In French, with line drawing of head scalation) https://www.biodiversitylibrary.org/item/38729#page/90/mode/1up

Atractaspididae
Reptiles described in 1907